The women's 4 × 100 metres relay at the 2022 World Athletics Championships was held at the Hayward Field in Eugene on 22 and 23 July 2022.

Records
Before the competition records were as follows:

Qualification standard
The standard to qualify automatically for entry was to finish in the first 10 at 2021 World Relays, completed by 6 2021-2022 top lists' teams.

Schedule
The event schedule, in local time (UTC-7), was as follows:

Results

Heats 
The first three in each heat (Q) and the next two fastest (q) qualified for the final.

Final 
The final started on 23 July at 19:30.

References

4 x 100 metres relay
Relays at the World Athletics Championships